Egypt is divided, for the purpose of public administration, according to a three-layer hierarchy and some districts are further subdivided, creating an occasional fourth layer.

The top-level of the hierarchy are 27 governorates (singular:  ,). The second-level, beneath and within governorates, are marakiz (singular:  ,) or aqsam (singular:  qism,). The third-level is composed of districts (singular:  ,) and villages (singular:  ,). There is a governing structure at each of these levels. Districts may be further divided into sub-districts as a fourth level.

There are also seven economic regions used for planning purposes, defined by the General Organization for Physical Planning (GOPP).

Provincial divisions 

Egypt is divided into 27 governorates (muhāfazāt) and each has a capital and at least one city. Each governorate is administered by a governor, who is appointed by the President of Egypt and serves at the president's discretion. Most governorates have a population density of more than one thousand per km2, while the three largest have a population density of less than two per km2. The governorates of Egypt are:

Alexandria Governorate 
Aswan Governorate 
Asyut Governorate 
Beheira Governorate 
Beni Suef Governorate 
Cairo Governorate 
Dakahlia Governorate 
Damietta Governorate 
Faiyum Governorate 
Gharbia Governorate 
Giza Governorate 
Ismailia Governorate 
Kafr El Sheikh Governorate 
Luxor Governorate 
Matruh Governorate 
Minya Governorate 
Monufia Governorate 
New Valley Governorate 
North Sinai Governorate 
Port Said Governorate 
Qalyubia Governorate 
Qena Governorate 
Red Sea Governorate
Sharqia Governorate 
Sohag Governorate 
South Sinai Governorate 
Suez Governorate

Municipal divisions 

At the municipal-level are markaz, kism, police-administered areas, and new cities. Generally, rural areas are divided into markaz whereas urban areas are divided into kism. As of 2013, there were 351 subdivisions, of which 177 were kism, 162 markaz, 9 new cities, and 3 police-administered areas. There are also unorganized areas in the Alexandria, Aswan, Asyut, Beheira, Beni Suef, Cairo, Dakahlia, Damietta, Faiyum, Giza, Ismailia, Kafr El Sheikh, Luxor, Minya, Port Said, Qalyubia, Qena, Sharqia, Sohag, and Suez governorates.

k - kism
m - markaz
n - new city
p - police-administered

	6 October 1 (k)
	6 October 2 (k)
	10th of Ramadan 1	(k)
	10th of Ramadan 2	(k)
	15 May 	(k)
	Abdeen		(k)
	Abnub		(m)
	Abu El Matamir	(m)
	Abu Hammad	(m)
	Abu Hummus	(m)
	Abu Kebir	(m)
	Abu Qirqas	(m)
	Abu Radis	(k)
	Abu Simbel	(m)
	Abu Tig		(m)
	Abu Tisht	(m)
	Abu Zenima	(k)
	Aga		(m)
	Agouza		(k)
	Ain Shams	(k)
	Akhmim		(m)
	Alexandria Port Police Dept.	(p)
	Amreya		(k)
	Arish 1		(k)
	Arish 2		(k)
	Arish 3		(k)
	Arish 4		(k)
	Armant	(m)
	Ashmoun	(m)
	Aswan		(k)
	Aswan		(m)
	Asyut		(m)
	Asyut 1		(k)
	Asyut 2		(k)
	Ataka		(k)
	Atfih		(m)
	Awlad Saqr	(m)
	Awsim	(m)
	Azbakeya	(k)
	Bab El Sharia	(k)
	Bab Sharq	(k)
	Badr		(k)
	Badr		(m)
	Banha		(k)
	Banha		(m)
	Baris Shurta	(m)
	Basyoun		(m)
	Beni Ebeid	(m)
	Beni Mazar	(m)
	Beni Suef	(k)
	Beni Suef	(m)
	Biba		(m)
	Bilbeis		(m)
	Bilqas		(m)
	Bir El Abd	(k)
	Birket El Sab	(m)
	Biyala		(m)
	Borg El Arab	(k)
	Bulaq		(k)
	Bulaq El Dakrur	(k)
	Burullus	(m)
	Dahab		(k)
	Dairut		(m)
	Damanhur	(k)
	Damanhur	(m)
	Damietta	(m)
	Damietta 1	(k)
	Damietta 2	(k)
	Dar El Salam	(m)
	Daraw		(m)
	Deir Mawas	(m)
	Dekernes	(m)
	Dekhela		(k)
	Desouk		(k)
	Desouk		(m)
	Dishna		(m)
	Diyarb Negm	(m)
	Dokki		(k)
	Edfu	(m)
	Edku	(m)
	El Ahram (k)		
	El Arab	(k)	
	El Arbein	(k)	
	El Atareen	(k)	
	El Ayyat	(m)	
	El Badari	(m)	
	El Badrashein	(m)	
	El Bagour	(m)	
	El Balyana	(m)	
	El Basal Port	(k)	
	El Basatin	(k)	
	El Dabaa	(k)	
	El Darb El Ahmar	(k)	
	El Dawahy	(k)	
	El Delengat	(m)	
	El Fashn	(m)	
	El Fath	(m)	
	El Gamaliya	(k)	
	El Gamaliya	(m)	
	El Ganayin	(k)	
	El Ghanayem	(m)	
	El Gomrok	(k)	
	El Hamam	(k)	
	El Hamool	(m)	
	El Hassana	(k)	
	El Hawamdiya	(k)	
	El Husseiniya	(m)	
	El Ibrahimiya	(m)	
	El Idwa	(m)	
	El Kawsar	(k)	
	El Khalifa	(k)	
	El Labban	(k)	
	El Mahalla El Kubra	(m)	
	El Mahalla El Kubra 1	(k)	
	El Mahalla El Kubra 2	(k)	
	El Mahmoudia	(m)	
	El Manakh	(k)	
	El Manasra	(k)	
	El Mansha	(m)	
	El Mansheya	(k)	
	El Manzala	(m)	
	El Maragha	(m)	
	El Marg		(k)
	El Matareya	(k)	
	El Matareya	(m)	
	El Muski	(k)	
	El Nozha	(k)	
	El Omraniya	(k)	
	El Qanater El Khayreya	(m)	
	El Qanayat	(k)	
	El Qantara	(m)	
	El Qantara El Sharqiya	(k)	
	El Qoseir	(k)	
	El Qurein	(k)	
	El Qusiya	(m)	
	El Rahmaniya	(m)	
	El Raml 1	(k)	
	El Raml 2	(k)	
	El Reyad	(m)	
	El Saff	(m)	
	El Salam	(k)	
	El Santa	(m)	
	El Sayeda Zeinab	(k)	
	El Segil	(k)	
	El Senbellawein	(m)	
	El Sharabiya	(k)	
	El Sharq	(k)	
	El Shohada	(m)	
	El Shorouk	(k)	
	El Tebbin	(k)	
	El Tor	(k)	
	El Usayrat	(m)	
	El Wahat El Bahariya	(k)	
	El Wahat El Khariga	(k)	
	El Waqf	(m)	
	El Warraq	(k)	
	El Wasta	(m)	
	El Weili	(k)	
	El Zaher	(k)	
	El Zarqa	(m)	
	El Zawya El Hamra 	(k)	
	El Zohur	(k)	
	Esna	(m)
	Faisal	(k)
	Faiyum	(k)
	Faiyum	(m)
	Faqous	(k)
	Faqous	(m)
	Faraskur	(m)
	Farshut	(m)
	Fayed	(m)
	Fuwa	(m)
	Gamasa	(k)
	Ganoubi 1	(k)
	Ganoubi 2	(k)
	Gharb Nubariya (k)
	Girga	(k)
	Girga	(m)
	Giza	(k)
	Giza	(m)
	Hada'iq El Qobbah	(k)
	Hala'ib (k)
	Heliopolis	(k)
	Helwan	(k)
	Hihya	(m)
	Hosh Essa	(m)
	Hurghada	(k)
	Hurghada 2	(k)
	Ibsheway	(m)
	Ihnasiya	(m)
	Imbaba	(k)
	Imbaba	(m)
	Ismailia	(m)
	Ismailia 1	(k)
	Ismailia 2	(k)
	Ismailia 3	(k)
	Itay El Barud	(m)
	Itsa	(m)
	Juhayna El Gharbiyah	(m)
	Kafr El Dawwar	(k)
	Kafr El Dawwar	(m)
	Kafr El Sheikh	(k)
	Kafr El Sheikh	(m)
	Kafr El Zayat	(m)
	Kafr Saad	(m)
	Kafr Saqr	(m)
	Kafr Shukr	(m)
	Karmoz	(k)
	Kerdasa	(m)
	Khanka		(m)
	Khusus		(k)
	Kom Hamada	(m)
	Kom Ombo	(m)
	Kotoor	(m)
	Luxor	(k)
	Luxor	(m)
	Maadi		(k)
	Maghaghah	(m)
	Mahallat Dimna	(m)
	Mallawi	(k)
	Mallawi	(m)
	Manfalut	(m)
	Mansoura	(m)
	Mansoura 1	(k)
	Mansoura 2	(k)
	Marina El Alamein	(k)
	Marsa Alam	(k)
	Mashtool El Souk	(m)
	Matay	(m)
	Menouf	(k)
	Menouf	(m)
	Mersa Matruh	(k)
	Metoubes (m)
	Minya	(k)
	Minya	(m)
	Minya El Qamh	(m)
	Minyet El Nasr	(m)
	Mit Ghamr	(k)
	Mit Ghamr	(m)
	Mit Salsil	(m)
	Moharam Bek	(k)
	Monshat El Nasr	(k)
	Montaza	(k)
	Mubarak Sharq El Tafrea	(k)
	Nabaroh (m)
	Nag Hammadi	(m)
	Nakhl	(k)
	Naqada	(m)
	Nasir Bush	(m)
	Nasr	(m)
	Nasr City 1	(k)
	Nasr City 2	(k)
	New Akhmim	(n)
	New Aswan	(n)
	New Asyut 	(n)
	New Beni Suef	(k)
	New Borg El Arab	(n)
	New Cairo 1	(k)
	New Cairo 2	(k)
	New Cairo 3	(k)
	New Damietta	(k)
	New Faiyum	(n)
	New Minya 	(n)
	New Qena 	(n)
	New Salhia 	(k)
	New Sohag	(n)
	New Toshka	(n)
	North Coast	(k)*
       North Coast     (k)
	Nuweiba		(k)
	Obour		(k)
	Old Cairo	(k)
	Port Fuad	(k)
	Port Fuad 2	(k)
	Port Said Police Dept.	(p)
	Qaha	(k)
	Qallin	(m)
	Qalyub	(k)
	Qalyub	(m)
	Qasr El Nil	(k)
	Qena	(k)
	Qena	(m)
	Qift	(m)
	Quesna	(m)
	Qus	(m)
	Rafah	(k)
	Ras El Bar	(k)
	Ras Gharib	(k)
	Ras Sidr	(k)
	Rod El Farag	(k)
	Rosetta	(m)
	Sadat City	(m)
	Safaga	(k)
	Sahil Salim	(m)
	Saint Catherine	(k)
	Sallum	(k)
	Samalut	(m)
	Samanoud	(m)
	Saqultah	(m)
	Sers El Lyan	(k)
	Shalateen	(k)
	Sharm El Sheikh	(k)
	Sheikh Zayed	(k)
	Sheikh Zuweid	(k)
	Shibin El Kom	(k)
	Shibin El Kom	(m)
	Shibin El Qanatir	(m)
	Shirbin	(m)
	Shubra	(k)
	Shubra El Kheima 1	(k)
	Shubra El Kheima 2	(k)
	Shubrakhit	(m)
	Shurtet El Dakhla	(m)
	Shurtet El Farafra	(m)
	Shurtet El Qasima	(k)
	Shurtet Rumana	(k)
	Sidfa	(m)
	Sidi Barrani	(k)
	Sidi Gaber	(k)
	Sidi Salem	(m)
	Sinnuris	(m)
	Siwa	(k)
	Sohag	(m)
	Sohag 1	(k)
	Sohag 2	(k)
	Suez	(k)
	Suez Port Police Dept.	(p)
	Sumusta El Waqf	(m)
	Taba	(k)
	Tahta	(k)
	Tahta	(m)
	Tala	(m)
	Talkha	(m)
	Tamiya	(m)
	Tanta	(m)
	Tanta 1	(k)
	Tanta 2	(k)
	Tell El Kebir	(m)
	Tibah Police Dept.	(m)
	Tima	(m)
	Timay El Imdid	(m)
	Tukh	(m)
	Tura	(k)
	Wadi El Natrun	(m)
	Yousef El Seddik	(m)
	Zagazig	(m)
	Zagazig 1	(k)
	Zagazig 2	(k)
	Zamalek	(k)
	Zefta	(m)
	Zeitoun	(k)

Submunicipal divisions
The village is the smallest local unit in rural communities, and is the equivalent of a district in urban areas. However, villages differ from each other in terms of legal status. The heads of villages or districts are appointed by the respective governors. In addition to this, districts are occasionally further divided into sub-district neighborhoods called sheyakha in rural areas, or residential districts (singular:  ,) in urban areas.

See also
 List of cities and towns in Egypt
 Economic Regions of Egypt

References 

 
Egypt
Egypt